Gordon Benson (born 12 May 1994 in Halifax, United Kingdom) is a professional British triathlete. He won the gold medal at the 2015 European Games in Baku, the first medal ever won at the European Games by Great Britain.

Gordon Benson is a member of the UK Sport Lottery Funded British Triathlon Podium Potential Squad. He is based in Leeds, where he grew up. He was educated at Leeds Grammar School and is currently reading Nutrition at the University of Leeds.

He was voted the British Triathlon Male Elite Junior Triathlete of the Year 2011 and 2012.

In June 2015, he competed in the inaugural European Games, for Great Britain in men's triathlon. He earned a gold medal. The following month he was part of the British team that took the bronze medal at the ITU Triathlon Mixed Relay World Championships in Hamburg.

Benson had represented Great Britain in athletics at the junior level, having won the silver medal in the 3000 metres at the 2011 European Youth Summer Olympic Festival.

References

External links
 
 
 
 
 

1994 births
Living people
Sportspeople from Leeds
English male triathletes
European Games medalists in triathlon
European Games gold medalists for Great Britain
Triathletes at the 2015 European Games
Triathletes at the 2016 Summer Olympics
Olympic triathletes of Great Britain